Zu is a small genus of ribbonfishes with currently two recognized species:
 Zu cristatus (Bonelli, 1819) (scalloped ribbonfish)
 Zu elongatus Heemstra & Kannemeyer, 1984 (taper-tail ribbonfish)

The scalloped ribbonfish is found around the oceans of the world in the tropical latitudes, but the taper-tail ribbonfish is limited to the southeast Atlantic.

References

Lampriformes